Albert-Mboyo Sambi Lokonga (born 22 October 1999) is a Belgian professional footballer who plays as a midfielder for  club Crystal Palace, on loan from Arsenal, and the Belgium national team. Sambi Lokonga came through Anderlecht's youth academy and made his senior debut with the club in 2017.

Club career

Anderlecht
Having first joined their youth academy in 2010, Sambi Lokonga signed his first professional contract with Anderlecht on 10 November 2017. He made his professional debut for Anderlecht in a 1–0 Belgian First Division A win over Eupen on 22 December 2017. In November 2019, Sambi Lokonga extended his contract with the club until 2023. On 27 September 2020, he scored the first goal of his senior career as Anderlecht drew 1–1 with Eupen.

Arsenal
On 19 July 2021, Sambi Lokonga signed a long-term contract with English club Arsenal after completing an approximately £17.2 million transfer, subject to the completion of regulatory processes. Arsenal manager Mikel Arteta was impressed with Sambi Lokonga, citing his intelligence and maturity for a young player. Sambi Lokonga made his debut in a 2−0 away loss against Brentford.

Loan to Crystal Palace

On 31 January 2023, fellow Premier League side Crystal Palace announced the signing of Sambi Lokonga on a short-term loan deal until the end of the 2022−23 season. He made his debut for the club on 4 February, coming on as a substitute for Will Hughes in a 2–1 away loss to Manchester United.

International career
Having previously played for Belgium at Belgium U17, Belgium U19 and Belgium U21 levels, Sambi Lokonga was called up to the senior Belgium squad in March 2021. He made his debut on 2 September 2021 in a World Cup qualifier against Estonia, a 5–2 away victory. He was introduced as a substitute for Eden Hazard in the 74th minute.

Media
Sambi Lokonga was involved in the Amazon Original sports docuseries All or Nothing: Arsenal, which documented the club by spending time with the coaching staff and players behind the scenes both on and off the field throughout their 2021–22 season.

Personal life
Sambi Lokonga was born in Belgium and is of Congolese descent, and his brother Paul-José M'Poku is also a professional footballer. He grew up in Verviers.

Career statistics

Club

International

References

External links
 Profile at the Arsenal F.C. website
 Profile at the Premier League website
 
 
 

1999 births
Living people
Footballers from Liège Province
Belgian footballers
Belgium youth international footballers
Belgium under-21 international footballers
Belgium international footballers
Association football midfielders
R.S.C. Anderlecht players
Arsenal F.C. players
Belgian Pro League players
Premier League players
Belgian expatriate footballers
Expatriate footballers in England
Belgian expatriate sportspeople in England
Black Belgian sportspeople
Belgian people of Democratic Republic of the Congo descent
People from Verviers